The secretary general of NATO is the chief civil servant of the North Atlantic Treaty Organization (NATO). The officeholder is an international diplomat responsible for coordinating the workings of the alliance, leading NATO's international staff, chairing the meetings of the North Atlantic Council and most major committees of the alliance, with the notable exception of the NATO Military Committee, as well as acting as NATO's spokesperson. The secretary general does not have a military command role; political, military and strategic decisions ultimately rest with the member states. Together with the Chair of the NATO Military Committee and the supreme allied commander, the officeholder is one of the foremost officials of NATO.

The current secretary general is former Norwegian Prime Minister Jens Stoltenberg, who took office on 1 October 2014. Stoltenberg's mission as secretary general was extended for another four-year term, meaning that he was to lead NATO until September 30, 2022. However, due to Russia's invasion of Ukraine in 2022, his term was extended further by another year.

History 
Article 9 of the North Atlantic Treaty requires NATO members to "establish a Council, on which each of them shall be represented." Accordingly, the North Atlantic Council was formed.  Initially the Council consisted of NATO members' foreign ministers and met annually. In May 1950, the desire for closer coordination on a day-to-day basis led to the appointment of Council deputies, permanently based in London and overseeing the workings of the organization.  Deputies were given full decision-making authority within the North Atlantic Council, but their work was supplemented by occasional meetings of the NATO foreign ministers.  The chairman of the deputies was given responsibility "for directing the organization and its work," including all of its civilian agencies.

The Council deputies met for the first time on July 25, 1950, and selected Charles Spofford, the United States deputy, as their chairman. Several important organisational changes quickly followed the establishment of Council deputies, most notably the establishment of a unified military command under a single supreme Allied commander.  This unification and the growing challenges facing NATO led to rapid growth in the institutions of the organisation and in 1951, NATO was reorganized to streamline and centralize its bureaucracy.  As part of the organization, the Council deputies were delegated with the authority to represent their governments in all matters, including those related to defense and finance, not just foreign affairs, greatly increasing their power and importance.

As the authority of the deputies increased, and the size of the organization grew, NATO established the Temporary Council Committee, chaired by W. Averell Harriman.  This group established an official secretariat in Paris to command NATO's bureaucracy. The committee also recommended that "the agencies of NATO needed to be strengthened and co-ordinate", and emphasized the need for someone other than the Chairman of the North Atlantic Council to become the senior leader of the alliance. In February 1952, North Atlantic Council accordingly established the position of secretary general to manage all civilian agencies of the organization, control its civilian staff, and serve the North Atlantic Council.

After the Lisbon Conference, the NATO states began looking for a person who could fill the role of secretary general. The position was first offered to Oliver Franks, the British ambassador to the United States, but he declined. Then, on March 12, 1952, the North Atlantic Council selected Hastings Ismay, a general from the Second World War, and Secretary of State for Commonwealth Relations in the British cabinet as secretary general.  Unlike later secretaries general who served as Chairman of the North Atlantic Council, Ismay was made the vice chairman of the council, with Spofford continuing to serve as chairman. Ismay was selected because of his high rank in the war, and his role "at the side of Churchill ... in the highest Allied Councils." As both a soldier and a diplomat, he was considered uniquely qualified for the position, and enjoyed the full support of all the NATO states.

Several months later, after Spofford retired from the NATO, the structure of the North Atlantic Council was changed slightly. One member of the council was selected annually as the president of the North Atlantic Council (a largely ceremonial role), and the secretary general officially became the Deputy President of the Council, as well as the chair of its meetings. Ismay served as secretary general until retiring in May, 1957.

After Ismay, Paul-Henri Spaak, an international diplomat and former prime minister of Belgium was selected as the second secretary general. Unlike Ismay, Spaak had no military experience, so his appointment represented a "deemphasis of the strictly military side of the Atlantic Alliance." When confirming Spaak's appointment in December 1956 during a session of the NATO foreign ministers, the North Atlantic Council also expanded the role of the secretary general in the organization. Largely as a result of the Suez Crisis, which had strained intra-alliance relations, the council issued a resolution to allow the secretary general "to offer his good officers informally at any time to member governments involved in a dispute and with their consent to initiate or facilitate procedures of inquiry, mediation, conciliation, or arbitration."

List of officeholders

The NATO countries selected the first secretary general on April 4, 1952. Since that time, twelve different diplomats have served officially as secretary general. Eight countries have been represented, with three secretaries general hailing from the United Kingdom, three from the Netherlands, two from Belgium, one from Italy, one from Germany, one from Spain, one from Denmark and one from Norway. The position has also been occupied temporarily on three occasions by an acting secretary general between appointments.

Responsibilities 
The NATO secretary general chairs several of the senior decision-making bodies of NATO.  In addition to the North Atlantic Council, he chairs the Defence Planning Committee and the Nuclear Planning Committee, two of NATO's important military organizations.  The secretary general also leads the Euro-Atlantic Partnership Council, the Mediterranean Cooperation Group, and serves as Joint Chairman of the Permanent Joint Council and the NATO-Ukraine Commission.

In a second role, the secretary general leads the staff of NATO.  He directs the International Staff of the organization, and the Office of the Secretary General.  The secretary general also directs his or her own Private Office.  All of these bodies draw personnel from all members of NATO, so the secretary general must carefully coordinate.  For assistance in his responsibilities, the secretary general also has a deputy appointed by the organization.

Selection 
There is no formal process for selecting the secretary general.  The members of NATO traditionally reach a consensus on who should serve next. This procedure often takes place through informal diplomatic channels, but it still can become contentious. For example, in 2009, controversy arose over the choice of Anders Fogh Rasmussen as secretary general, due to opposition from Turkey.

NATO's chief military officer, the supreme Allied commander Europe, is traditionally an American, and the secretary general has traditionally been a European. However, there is nothing in NATO's charter that would preclude a Canadian or American from becoming the secretary general.

Deputy Secretary General

See also

Supreme Allied Commander Europe
Chairman of the NATO Military Committee

Notes

Citations

References

External links

 
1952 establishments